The Cleveland class was a group of light cruisers built for the U.S. Navy during World War II. They were the most numerous class of light cruisers ever built.  Fifty-two were ordered, and 36 completed, 27 as cruisers and 9 as light aircraft carriers.  They were deactivated within a few years after the end of the war, but six were converted into missile ships and some of these served into the 1970s.  One ship of the class remains as a museum ship.

Development
A development of the preceding  , the Cleveland class were designed with increased cruising range, anti-aircraft armament, and torpedo protection, compared with earlier U.S. cruisers.

After the London Naval Treaty of 1930, the US Navy took up a renewed interest in the 6" gun-armed light cruiser, partially due to the Navy complaining about the 8" gun's slow rate of fire, of 3 rounds per minute compared to the 10 rounds per minute of 6" guns. At this time, the US Navy began to deploy drones to use as targets for anti-aircraft targets, which could simulate both dive and torpedo bombers. The simulations showed that without fire control directors and computers, the ships of the fleet would be almost helpless against the density of aircraft attack envisioned in any future war. Mechanical computers alone could weigh up to 10 tons and had to be housed below decks for both weight and protection measures. As World War II was to prove, the pre-war assumptions were optimistic as eventually, every anti-aircraft gun platform above 20mm would end up having remote power, with fire control and radar aiming.

As designed the Cleveland class was already a tight design but requests to widen the ship were turned down as it would affect production rates. Shortly after the Fall of France, the Two-Ocean Navy Act changed those production rates rapidly. In order to fit the new heavier fire control and radar systems within the allotted tonnage for a cruiser, the No. 3 gun turret was omitted. This also gave room for the enlargement of the bridge spaces to accommodate the new combat information center and necessary radars, along with enough tonnage to fit an additional pair of 5"/38 twin mounts, located fore and aft of the superstructure, with wider arcs of fire. Despite the loss of three 6-inch guns compared to the preceding Brooklyn and St. Louis-class, the more advanced fire control gave the Cleveland class a firepower advantage in practical use.

Towards the end of World War II, the increase of light anti-aircraft weapons made the class top-heavy so to compensate, some ships had one of the two catapults, and No. 1 turret rangefinders removed. Top weight issues would plague the class with every addition of equipment having to be weighed against what would have to be removed, for example, the tighter installation of the control radar necessitated the removal of the 20mm clipping rooms, where 20mm rounds were loaded into their magazines.

Subclasses
Two of each of these had enlarged superstructures to serve as flagships. Following the naming convention at the time, all the ships completed as cruisers were named for US cities or towns.

Service
The Cleveland-class cruisers served mainly in the Pacific Fleet during World War II, especially with the Fast Carrier Task Force and some served off the coasts of Europe and Africa in the U.S. Atlantic Fleet. All of these warships, though worked heavily, survived the war. None were recommissioned for the Korean War, as they required a crew almost as large as the  ships, so those were reactivated instead. All non-converted ships were sold off from the reserve fleet for scrapping beginning in 1959. The six that were completed as or converted into guided missile cruisers were reactivated during the 1950s and then served into the 1970s. All, particularly the Talos-armed ships, suffered from greater stability problems than the original design due to the extra top weight. This was particularly severe in Galveston, leading to its premature decommissioning in 1970.  and  had to have a large amount of ballast and internal rearrangement to allow service into the 1970s. The last of these missile ships in service, Oklahoma City, was decommissioned in December 1979.

Museum ship
One Cleveland-class ship remains.

Ships in class

See also
 List of cruisers of the United States Navy

References

Bibliography

External links

Statistics
Global Security.org - Cleveland class cruiser
Hazegray - US Cruisers List: US Light/Heavy/AntiAircraft Cruisers, Part 2
Cleveland Class Light Cruisers

Cruiser classes